Ducati Energia SpA is an Italian company based in Bologna, part of the Ducati group, which produces electrical and electronic components.

It was founded in 1926 by the Ducati brothers, Adriano, Marcello and Bruno, to produce vacuum tubes, capacitors and other radio components.  The original Ducati company was called Società Scientifica Radiobrevetti Ducati (SSR Ducati).

In 1935 Ducati became successful enough to enable construction of a new factory in the Borgo Panigale area of the city.

In the late 1940s Ducati began producing engines for bicycles and later motorcycles, leading to the later split into two companies: Ducati Meccanica and Ducati Elettrotecnica.  The former specializing in the manufacture of motorcycles and the latter for radios and electrical devices and components.

Ducati Elettrotecnica was renamed Ducati Energia in the 1980s. It designs and produces a wide range of electronic components and subsystems for use in automotive, construction, security, and transmission and distribution (T&D) energy efficiency.

It has a presence in many countries in Europe, Middle East, Asia, Africa and Latin America.

See also 

List of Italian companies

References

External links 
 

Electronics companies of Italy
Electrical engineering companies of Italy
Renewable energy companies of Italy
Wind turbine manufacturers
Technology companies of Italy
Electronics companies established in 1926
Italian companies established in 1926
Ducati (company)
Multinational companies headquartered in Italy